The zhengni (琤尼) is a traditional Chinese bowed zither, similar to the ancient Chinese instrument yazheng and Korean ajaeng. It is used by the Zhuang people of Guangxi.

See also 
 Chinese music
 List of Chinese musical instruments

References

Chinese musical instruments